Rolf Kemler (born 13 February 1945), is a German molecular biologist who is currently the Emeritus Director at the Max Planck Institute of Immunobiology and Epigenetics. He has contributed significantly to the study of anchoring junctions, specifically the cadherin family of proteins and was the recipient of the 2020 Canada Gairdner International Award for his work in the field.

References

German molecular biologists
1945 births
Max Planck Institute directors
Living people
Place of birth missing (living people)